Longfellow House could refer to several places, some of which are related to American poet Henry Wadsworth Longfellow:

Wadsworth-Longfellow House, in Portland, Maine, where the poet grew up
Longfellow House–Washington's Headquarters National Historic Site (formerly Longfellow National Historic Site), in Cambridge, Massachusetts, where he spent most of his life
Longfellow House, in Minneapolis, Minnesota, a replica of the Longfellow National Historic Site
Longfellow House in Pascagoula, Mississippi, also known as Bellevue, listed on the National Register of Historic Places